Douglas Matías Arezo Martínez (born 21 November 2002) is a Uruguayan professional footballer who plays as a striker for Peñarol, on loan from Spanish club Granada.

Club career
An academy graduate of River Plate Montevideo, Arezo made his professional debut on 14 July 2019 in a 0–0 draw against Progreso. He scored his first professional goal on 10 August 2019, in a 2–1 league win against Juventud.

On 31 January 2022, Spanish club Granada announced the signing of Arezo on a four-and-a-half-year deal.

On 20 January 2023, Arezo returned to Uruguayan league by signing for Peñarol on a loan deal until the end of the year.

International career
Arezo is a former Uruguay youth international and has represented his nation at 2017 South American U-15 Championship and 2019 South American U-17 Championship. He scored five goals including a hat-trick against Ecuador in the latter tournament and finished second in top scorers list.

In March 2023, Arezo received his first call-up to the senior team for friendly matches against Japan and South Korea.

Career statistics

Honours
Individual
 Uruguayan Primera División Team of the Year: 2020

References

External links
 

2002 births
Living people
Footballers from Montevideo
Association football forwards
Uruguayan footballers
Uruguay youth international footballers
Uruguayan Primera División players
La Liga players
Club Atlético River Plate (Montevideo) players
Granada CF footballers
Peñarol players
Uruguayan expatriate footballers
Uruguayan expatriate sportspeople in Spain
Expatriate footballers in Spain